The 2004 Gran Premio Telmex/Tecate was the fourteenth and final round of the
2004 Bridgestone Presents the Champ Car World Series Powered by Ford season, held on November 7, 2004, at the Autódromo Hermanos Rodríguez in Mexico City, Mexico. Sébastien Bourdais won the pole and the race and in doing so also secured his first of four Champ Car titles.

Qualifying results

Race

Caution flags

Notes

 New Track Record Sébastien Bourdais 1:25.919 (Qualification Session #2)
 New Race Record Sébastien Bourdais 1:39:02.662
 Average Speed 106.327 mph

Final championship standings

 Bold indicates the Season Champion.
Drivers' Championship standings

 Note: Only the top five positions are included.

External links
 Full Weekend Times & Results
 Friday Qualifying Results
 Saturday Qualifying Results
 Bourdais Earns the Title with Victory in Mexico
 Race Box Score

Mexico
Gran Premio Telmex tecate, 2004
Gran Premio Tecate